Duffer may refer to:
 
 Duffer (Narnia), invisible dwarves in The Chronicles of Narnia
 Duffer, in Australian English, a person occupied in cattle raiding
 A weak player in the game of chess

In biology:
 Discophora (butterfly), a genus of butterflies commonly known as duffers
 Banded duffer (Discophora deo), a butterfly found in Asia
 Common duffer (Discophora sondaica), a butterfly found in Southeast Asia
 Great duffer (Discophora timora), a butterfly found in South Asia
 Southern duffer (Discophora lepida), a butterfly found in India

See also 
The Defence of Duffer's Drift, a 1904 book by Ernest Dunlop Swinton